Tanka Bahadur Pandit(Nepali:सुमन बैरागी) (born 1982) also known as Suman Bairagi, is a lyricist and songwriter from Nepal. He started his musical journey in 2002, and since that year, he has worked on hundreds of songs. His first song was "Ashu ko talau" and his first song collection was "Sathi." Popular songs from Bairagi include najalaaideu mitu, timile sadhai pida diyau.

He has been awarded National Capital awards and Box office music awards. He won it by one of his songs, kahi bhetiyana dhan phalne rukh, which also won the National Song of the Year Awards.

Songs

Awards

Honor

Jury

Organization Portfolio

References 

Living people
1982 births